Mike Hollingsworth may refer to:

 Mike Hollingsworth (animator), American artist, animator and stand-up comedian
 Michael Hollingsworth (cyclist) (born 1943), Australian Olympic cyclist
 Michael Hollingsworth (writer) (born 1950), Canadian playwright, theatre director and artist
 Michael Hollingsworth, American housing activist and 2021 New York City Council candidate for the 35th district